Schuylkill River Passenger Rail is a proposed passenger train service along the Schuylkill River between Philadelphia and Reading, Pennsylvania, with intermediate stops in Norristown, King of Prussia, Phoenixville, and Pottstown.

Passenger trains previously ran on this route from 1838 to 1981, when SEPTA discontinued service past Norristown on what is now known as the Manayunk/Norristown Line. Since then, various proposals have been made to restore full service to Reading.

Interest around the route has grown in the 2020s. In 2021 Amtrak included the route in its 2035 expansion vision. In 2022 county governments formed the Schuylkill River Passenger Rail Authority to further the development of the project.

History

Prior service

The Philadelphia, Germantown and Norristown Railroad and the Philadelphia and Reading Railway Company built the first rail line between Philadelphia and Reading in the 1830s. This became the Main Line of the Reading Company. The Pennsylvania Railroad (PRR) built the competing Schuylkill Branch along a parallel route in the 1880s. In 1930, the PRR electrified the portion of its line between Philadelphia and Norristown. The Reading Company did the same in 1933.

The City of Philadelphia and suburban counties began providing public funds under contract with the PRR and Reading Company for continuation and improvement of regional rail service. Because the Reading's Norristown line was considered the stronger of the two, PRR service was cut back to Manayunk in 1960.

Conrail assumed operations of both lines in April 1976, resulting in all freight activity shifting to the former Reading Main Line. Commuter service on the former PRR line was extended from Manayunk to Ivy Ridge station in order to serve a new park-and-ride lot. Service to Reading used electric multiple-unit cars between Philadelphia's Reading Terminal and Norristown, and diesel-electric "push-pull" cars from Norristown to Reading. This operation continued until SEPTA ceased funding for the diesel section in 1981, two years prior to taking direct control of Philadelphia's commuter rail routes from Conrail. In 1986 service on the former PRR line was cut back from Ivy Ridge to Cynwyd station in Lower Merion Township.

Schuylkill Valley Metro

From 2000 to 2002, the Delaware Valley Regional Planning Commission, SEPTA, and other regional stakeholders studied the possible return of passenger rail service between Philadelphia and Reading, a project known as the Schuylkill Valley Metro (SVM).

The SVM would use both sides of the former SEPTA R6 lines; the former PRR Schuylkill Branch between Suburban Station and Ivy Ridge (Cynwyd Line), and the former Reading's main line between Jefferson Station and Norristown (Manayunk/Norristown Line), before merging on the old Reading Main Line (now Norfolk Southern's Harrisburg Line) west of the current Norristown station.  A new spur, called the Cross-County Segment, would split off at Port Kennedy (near Valley Forge), and would allow SVM trains to access King of Prussia, Pennsylvania, and the Great Valley Corporate Center in Malvern, Pennsylvania, using the former PRR/Penn Central Trenton Cutoff (now Norfolk Southern's Dale Secondary) used by the former PRR as a freight-only bypass around Philadelphia, although an alternative would be to have the Cross-County segment serve only King of Prussia with SEPTA extending the existing Norristown High-Speed Line to King of Prussia, via the Trenton Cutoff.

Unlike the RDG trains, the new SVM would be entirely electric, with power being supplied by Amtrak, SEPTA, and (between Norristown and Reading) the Exelon Corporation, the successor company to the former Philadelphia Electric Company, later PECO Energy.  Existing catenary wires, powered at 12 kV, 25 Hz AC, would be used on the old lines, with new high-tension catenary poles, powered at 25 kV, 60 Hz AC, and similar to the system utilized on the Northeast Corridor north of New Haven, Connecticut, would be employed west of Norristown.

Planners intended to operate trains at 15-minute intervals during peak travel times, Mondays to Fridays, and at 30-minute intervals at all other times. Norfolk Southern Railway trains would have been able to use most of the system at all hours, but would have been restricted to overnight movements at some locations after SVM ceased operations at night between Midnight and 6 a.m.

In August 2006, Pennsylvania Governor Edward Rendell announced that funding for the SVM project would not be forthcoming and that it should be considered dead. In December 2007, Montgomery County authorized an unsuccessful study that looked at possible new funding sources.  Congressman Jim Gerlach announced in April 2011 that the results from that Montgomery County study would be soon published.

Greenline
Another alternate approach, known as the Greenline, proposed to serve the towns of Oaks and Phoenixville via a new connection at the current Paoli/Thorndale Line at Paoli Station. This project was cancelled when funding could not be obtained.

Norristown Extension
After the Schuylkill Valley Metro plan was rejected by FTA, the Montgomery County Planning Commission initiated the R6 Extension Study (later called the Norristown Extension) as an alternative approach. Unlike the SVM, the R6 Extension Study would only see electrification extended as far as King of Prussia (with SEPTA extending the Norristown High Speed Service) and no major reconstruction of any platforms. Any service west of King of Prussia would require new construction and the purchasing of extra push-pull consists hauled by dual-mode locomotives. Funding for the R6 Extension Study was to be provided by revenue earned via a proposed plan to toll U.S. Route 422 between Pottstown and King of Prussia. The tolling idea, suggested by the Delaware Valley Regional Planning Commission (DVRPC), was lambasted by several regional politicians, most notably Pennsylvania House of Representatives member Mike Vereb. Vereb and the influential passenger rail advocacy group Pennsylvania Transit Expansion Coalition jointly appeared at a DVRPC open forum on September 13, 2011 where DVRPC Executive Director Barry Seymour was presenting. On October 5, 2011, under increasing pressure and opposition, DVRPC cancelled the tolling proposal and plans for the Norristown Extension.

Recent efforts

In mid-2018, the borough of Phoenixville began a study to restore SEPTA passenger rail service between Norristown and Phoenixville along Norfolk Southern freight railroad tracks. In 2018, a panel led by the Greater Reading Chamber Alliance pushed for an extension of the Manayunk/Norristown Line to Reading, with service terminating either at the Franklin Street Station in Reading or in Wyomissing. The proposed extension would utilize existing Norfolk Southern freight railroad tracks. Before service can be implemented, a study would need to take place.

In 2020, the Pennsylvania Department of Transportation plans to finalize a study on the feasibility of extending passenger train service from Norristown to Reading along the Norfolk Southern freight line. The proposed extension is projected to cost $365 million, which includes buying the trains and paying Norfolk Southern to use the line, with an annual operating cost of $20 million. Stations will be located in Reading, Pottstown, Royersford, Phoenixville, and Norristown; from where the train will follow the existing Manayunk/Norristown Line to Philadelphia.

In March 2021, Amtrak announced its "Amtrak Connects US" plan to expand service to new cities by 2035. The proposal includes service between Philadelphia and Reading.

In May 2022, Berks, Chester, and Montgomery counties formed the Schuylkill River Passenger Rail Authority for the purpose of furthering the project. The authority's first meeting was held in July 2022.

References

External links
Schuylkill Valley Metro
Amtrak proposal

SEPTA Regional Rail
Proposed railway lines in Pennsylvania
Proposed Amtrak routes